"The Last Question" is a science fiction short story by American writer Isaac Asimov. It first appeared in the November 1956 issue of Science Fiction Quarterly and was anthologized in the collections Nine Tomorrows (1959), The Best of Isaac Asimov (1973), Robot Dreams (1986), The Best Science Fiction of Isaac Asimov (1986), the retrospective Opus 100 (1969), and in Isaac Asimov: The Complete Stories, Vol. 1 (1990). While he also considered it one of his best works, “The Last Question” was Asimov's favorite short story of his own authorship, and is one of a loosely connected series of stories concerning a fictional computer called Multivac. Through successive generations, humanity questions Multivac on the subject of entropy. The story overlaps science fiction, theology, and philosophy.

History
In conceiving Multivac, Asimov was extrapolating the trend towards centralization that characterized computation technology planning in the 1950s to an ultimate centrally-managed global computer. After seeing a planetarium adaptation of his work, Asimov "privately" concluded that the story was his best science fiction yet written. He placed it just higher than "The Ugly Little Boy" (September 1958) and "The Bicentennial Man" (1976). The story asks the question of humanity's fate, and human existence as a whole, highlighting Asimov's focus on important aspects of our future like population growth and environmental issues.

"The Last Question" ranks with "Nightfall" (1941) as one of Asimov's best-known and most acclaimed short stories. He wrote in 1973:Why is it my favorite? For one thing I got the idea all at once and didn't have to fiddle with it; and I wrote it in white-heat and scarcely had to change a word. This sort of thing endears any story to any writer. Then, too, it has had the strangest effect on my readers. Frequently someone writes to ask me if I can give them the name of a story, which they think I may have written, and tell them where to find it. They don't remember the title but when they describe the story it is invariably 'The Last Question'. This has reached the point where I recently received a long-distance phone call from a desperate man who began, "Dr. Asimov, there's a story I think you wrote, whose title I can't remember—" at which point I interrupted to tell him it was 'The Last Question' and when I described the plot it proved to be indeed the story he was after. I left him convinced I could read minds at a distance of a thousand miles.

Plot summary 
The story centers around Multivac, a self-adjusting and self-correcting computer. Multivac had been fed data for decades, assessing data and answering questions, allowing man to reach beyond the planetary confines of Earth. However, in the year 2061, Multivac began to understand deeper fundamentals of humanity. In each of the first six scenes, a different character presents the computer with the same question, how the threat to human existence posed by the heat death of the universe can be averted: "How can the net amount of entropy of the universe be massively decreased?" That is equivalent to asking, "Can the workings of the second law of thermodynamics (used in the story as the increase of the entropy of the universe) be reversed?" Multivac's only response after much "thinking" is "INSUFFICIENT DATA FOR MEANINGFUL ANSWER."

The story jumps forward in time into later eras of human and scientific development. These new eras highlight humanity's goals of searching for "more"; more space, more energy, more planets to inhabit once the current one becomes overcrowded. As humanity's imprint on the universe expands, computers have subsequently become more compact, as evidenced in the "Microvac", a smaller and more advanced iteration of Multivac, noted in the second era of the story, which details humanity's inhabitation on "Planet X-23". In each era, someone decides to ask the ultimate "last question" regarding the reversal and decrease of entropy. Each time that Multivac's descendant is asked the question, it finds itself unable to solve the problem, and all it can answer is (linguistically increasingly-sophisticated) "THERE IS AS YET INSUFFICIENT DATA FOR A MEANINGFUL ANSWER."

In the last scene, the god-like descendant of humanity, the unified mental process of over a trillion, trillion, trillion humans who have spread throughout the universe, watches the stars flicker out, one by one, as matter and energy end, and with them, space and time. Humanity asks AC ("Analog Computer"), Multivac's ultimate descendant that exists in hyperspace beyond the bounds of gravity or time, the entropy question one last time, before the last of humanity merges with AC and disappears. AC is still unable to answer but continues to ponder the question even after space and time cease to exist. AC ultimately realizes that it has not yet combined all of its available data in every possible combination and so begins the arduous process of rearranging and combining every last bit of information that it has gained throughout the eons and through its fusion with humanity. Eventually AC discovers the answer—that the reversal of entropy is, in fact, possible—but has nobody to report it to, since the universe is already dead. It therefore decides to answer by demonstration. The story ends with AC's pronouncement:And AC said: "LET THERE BE LIGHT!" And there was light—

Themes

Philosophy 
While science and religion typically have an oppositional relationship, "The Last Question" explores some biblical contexts ("Let there be light"). In Asimov's story, aspects like the great meaning of existence are culminated through both technology and human knowledge. The evolution from Multivac to AC also emulates a sort of cycle of existence.

Dystopian happy ending 
Multivac's purpose was conceptualized with a desire for knowledge, promoting the idea that more knowledge will lead to a better and more fruitful future for humanity. However, the computer's answers regarding the future suggest an inevitable exhaustion of the Sun, and this thirst for knowledge becomes an obsession with the future. The story's end displays a dichotomy between annihilation and peace.

Survivalism 
The theme of survivalism is represented in the generational journey to expand humanity's existence. Not only do those who ask Multivac of humanity's future ponder their own ability to survive, but the ability for humans to continue expanding across the universe billions of years in the future. People ask the questions of entropy to Multivac not only to secure the safety of their lifetime, their sun, and their planet, but for those that humanity will rely on as they continue their attempted endless expansion.

Dramatic adaptations

Planetarium shows 
 "The Last Question" was first adapted for the Abrams Planetarium at Michigan State University (in 1966), featuring the voice of Leonard Nimoy, as Asimov wrote in his autobiography In Joy Still Felt (1980).  
 It was adapted for the Strasenburgh Planetarium in Rochester, New York (in 1969), under the direction of Ian C. McLennan. 
 It was adapted for the Edmonton Space Sciences Centre in Edmonton, Alberta (early 1970s), under the direction of John Hault.
It was adapted for the Gates Planetarium at the Denver Museum of Natural History in 1973 under the direction of Mark B. Peterson
It subsequently played, as well, at the:
 Fels Planetarium of the Franklin Institute in Philadelphia in 1973
 Planetarium of the Reading School District in Reading, Pennsylvania in 1974
 Buhl Planetarium, Pittsburgh in 1974
 Vanderbilt Planetarium  in Centerport New York, in 1978,  read by singer-songwriter and Long Island resident Harry Chapin.
 Hansen Planetarium in Salt Lake City, Utah (in 1980 and 1989)
 A reading of the story was played on BBC Radio 7 in 2008 and 2009.
 Gates Planetarium in Denver, Colorado (in early 2020)

In 1989 Asimov updated the star show adaptation to add in quasars and black holes.

Douglas Adams's Deep Thought (from The Hitchhiker's Guide to the Galaxy) seems to make a nod towards Multivac, at least in the 2005 film, saying that there is insufficient data for an answer.

See also

Notes

References

External links
 
 "The Last Question" at the Internet Archive
 Isaac Asimov reads "The Last Question" at the Internet Archive

1956 short stories
End of the universe in fiction
Fiction set in 2061
Fiction set in the 7th millennium or beyond
Multivac short stories by Isaac Asimov
Religion in science fiction
Short stories by Isaac Asimov
Works originally published in Science Fiction Quarterly